World War II Heritage City (officially American World War II Heritage City) is an honorary designation applied by National Park Service of the United States government to an American city or region in recognition of its contributions to the war effort of World War II and its continuing work to preserve its military history.

History

The idea for the World War II Heritage City program was originated by Wilbur D. Jones, a retired United States Navy captain and military historian, in about 2008. The designation was made law in an act sponsored by United States Senator Thom Tillis and United States Representative David Rouzer and signed by President of the United States Donald Trump in 2019 as Public Law 116–9.

In September 2020, Wilmington, North Carolina was designated the first World War II Heritage City.

Criteria
Any city credited with a major contribution to the American war effort during World War II and which, since the end of hostilities, has actively endeavored to preserve its military legacy can be designated a World War II Heritage City. The Secretary of the Interior is authorized to designate cities. No more than one such city in any single state or territory can be named. Other jurisdictions, such as counties, towns, or townships are eligible.

List of Heritage Cities

East Hartford, Connecticut
Pensacola and Escambia County, Florida, Florida
Savannah and Chatham County, Georgia
Evansville, Indiana
Wichita, Kansas
New Orleans, Louisiana
Springfield, Massachusetts
Pascagoula, Mississippi
Lewistown, Montana
Paterson, New Jersey
Los Alamos County, New Mexico
Wilmington, North Carolina
Dayton and Montgomery County, Ohio
Pittsburgh, Pennsylvania
Oak Ridge, Tennessee
South Texas Bend area and Corpus Christi, Texas
Tri-Cities (Kennewick, Pasco, Richland and West Richland), Washington
Manitowoc, Wisconsin
Casper and Natrona County, Wyoming

See also
 Hero City (Soviet Union)

References

Community awards
World War II memorials in the United States
World War II Heritage Cities